Heptad ('group of 7') or heptade may refer to:

Heptad (chord), heptachord in music (set)
Heptad (computing), a group of 7 bits in computing
Heptad repeat, a structural motif in proteins
L'Heptade, an album by Harmonium in 1976

See also
 Hexad (disambiguation) ('group of 6')
 Octad (disambiguation) ('group of 8')